Norma Aparecida Almeida Pinto Guimarães d'Áurea Bengell (21 February 1935 – 9 October 2013) was a Brazilian film, stage and television actress, singer-songwriter, screenwriter and director. She appeared in several episodes of T.H.E. Cat, the first being in 1966 episode “To Kill a Priest”.

Biography
Bengell was born in Rio de Janeiro, Brazil. She was the daughter of Christian Friedrich Bengel, a Belgian-born German piano tuner, and Maria da Glória Guimarães, a wealthy young Brazilian woman from the South Zone of Rio de Janeiro. Around the age of 10, her parents separated. Being rebellious, Norma was interned in a college of nuns. After a difficult time, she began working in the early 1950s, first as a model and then as a revue star, where she developed her singing career.

Career
Bengell was active in the film industry from 1959. She appeared in numerous international productions, including an extended period during the mid-1960s co-starring in Italian productions, in which she was usually cast as the protagonist's romantic interest. She is possibly best known for starring with Alberto Sordi in Alberto Lattuada's Mafioso (1962) and in Sergio Corbucci's The Hellbenders (1967). She had a major role as a prostitute in Anselmo Duarte's Keeper of Promises (1962), a Brazilian drama that was nominated for the Academy Award for Best Foreign Language Film in 1963 and won the Golden Palm at Cannes Film Festival in 1962. Earlier that same year, she caused major controversy after appearing nude in a scene of the Ruy Guerra film Os Cafajestes.

In 1987, she directed her first film, Eternamente Pagu, a biography of Patrícia Galvão. In 1996, she directed an adaptation of José de Alencar's novel The Guarani, also titled The Guarani.

Death
She died from lung cancer aged 78 in Rio de Janeiro on 9 October 2013.

References

External links

1935 births
2013 deaths
Actresses from Rio de Janeiro (city)
Brazilian people of German descent
Brazilian film actresses
Brazilian television actresses
Brazilian women film directors
Brazilian film directors
Deaths from lung cancer in Brazil